Charles "Chub" Reynolds (c. 1932 – October 8, 1990) was an American football and baseball coach.  He served as the head football coach at  Bethel College and Seminary—now known as Bethel University—in Arden Hills, Minnesota from 1970 to 1979 and at Northwestern College—now known as the University of Northwestern – St. Paul—in Roseville, Minnesota from 1988 to 1989, compiling a career college football coaching record of 46–62.  In 1980, he became an assistant football and head baseball coach at Northwestern College.  Reynolds served as the head football coach for under two seasons—the 1989 season and the 1990 season until his death, just two days after coaching his last game.  His coaching record at Northwestern was 10–8.

The school named the football stadium, Reynolds Field, in his honor in 1990.

References

Year of birth missing
1930s births
1990 deaths
American men's basketball players
Augustana (South Dakota) Vikings men's basketball players
Bethel Royals football coaches
Northwestern Eagles baseball coaches
Northwestern Eagles football coaches
Sportspeople from Sioux Falls, South Dakota
Deaths from cancer in Minnesota